Independence Park (Portuguese: Parque da Independência) is a park in Ipiranga, São Paulo, Brazil. The Ipiranga Museum is located at the park.

Gallery

References

External links

 Independence Park at City of São Paulo

Parks in São Paulo